Colorado Family Action (CFA) is a Christian fundamentalist lobbying organization founded in 2007. It opposes gay marriage or domestic partnership, gay adoption, and adoption by unmarried people.
The organization advocates for conversion therapy, the pseudoscientific practice of trying to change sexual orientation. It fights against birth control access
and legal marijuana.

CFA is a Family Policy Council, meaning that it is a state-based affiliate of Focus on the Family.

Anti-LGBT policy

Colorado Family Action director Debbie Chaves states there is an "LGBTQ agenda driving policy" in Colorado which justifies CFA's support for legal conversion therapy. Chaves opposes sex education for the same reason, supporting instead "a biblical world view of sexuality" without gay people.

In conjunction with Lieutenant Governor Jane Norton, CFA lead the 2006 campaign that outlawed gay marriage in the Colorado Constitution.

Board of directors
The board of directors sets CFA's policy. Notable past and present board members listed by the Colorado Secretary of State include:
 Mike Kopp, Colorado senator
 Michael J. Norton, United States Attorney for Colorado from 1988 to 1993 and husband of former Lieutenant Governor Jane Norton
 Doug Stimple, prominent Colorado builder and developer
 Craig A. Saeman, CDO of Catholic Charities of Denver
 Mark Cowart, COO at Church For All Nations, a Colorado Springs megachurch
 Andy Limes, Principal at SDR Ventures, an investment bank
 Marc Butler, owner of a glass and window business, contractor on Canvas Stadium

References

Religion in Colorado
Christian organizations established in 2007
American Christian political organizations
Politics of Colorado
2007 establishments in Colorado
Evangelical parachurch organizations
Organizations that oppose LGBT rights in the United States
Conservative organizations in the United States